Fruit by the Foot is a fruit snack made by General Mills and distributed under the Betty Crocker brand. It was introduced in 1992 in North America. It is still in production.

Ingredients
Fruit by the Foot's primary ingredients are sugar, maltodextrin, corn syrup, pear puree concentrate, and palm oil. Its primary flavors are derived from artificial colors and flavors.

Promotions

The paper backing is occasionally printed with games, jokes, or trivia facts. In the early 1990s, Fruit by the Foot came with stickers as a marketing prize. Children would often place these stickers on their lunch boxes to prove they had eaten Fruit by the Foot.

In early 1999, Nintendo and General Mills worked together on a promotional television advertising campaign costing $5 million. The advertisement by Saatchi began on January 25 with Fruit by the Foot snacks including tips on various Nintendo 64 games on the wax paper. Ninety different tips were available, with three variations of thirty tips each.

Current marketing slogans include "3 Long Feet of Fruity Fun!"

See also
Fruit Roll-Ups, a similar product

References

Brand name confectionery
Brand name snack foods
General Mills brands
Products introduced in 1991